"Honky Tonk" is an instrumental written by Billy Butler, Bill Doggett, Clifford Scott, and Shep Shepherd. Doggett recorded it as a two-part single in 1956. It became Doggett's signature piece and a standard recorded by many other performers.

The instrumental peaked at number two for three weeks on the Billboard Hot 100, and was the biggest R&B hit of the year, spending thirteen non-consecutive weeks at the top of the charts.  It was included in Robert Christgau's "Basic Record Library" of 1950s and 1960s recordings, published in Christgau's Record Guide: Rock Albums of the Seventies (1981).

James Brown version
In 1972, James Brown recorded "Honky Tonk" with his band The J.B.'s, who were credited as "The James Brown Soul Train". The song was released as a two-part single which reached number seven on the R&B chart and number 44 on the pop chart.

References

1950s instrumentals
1956 singles
1956 songs
1972 singles
American rock-and-roll songs
James Brown songs
King Records (United States) singles
Songs written by Henry Glover